Blue Rock may refer to:

 Blue Rock, Ohio, United States
 Blue Rock Records, a subsidiary of Mercury Records
 Celtic Blue Rock Community Arts Festival, a charity-based festival
 Blue Rock (album), by The Cross
 Blues rock, a form of rock music

See also
 Blue Rock Creek, a stream in Ohio
 Blue Rock Springs Creek
 Blue Rock State Park
 Blue Rock Studio in New York City
 Blue rock thrush, a species of chat
 Blue Rock Township
 Blue Rocks (disambiguation)